Case management is the coordination of services on behalf of an individual person who may be considered a case in different settings such as health care, nursing, rehabilitation, social work, disability insurance, employment, and law. Case management may refer to:

Case management (mental health), a specific approach for the coordination of community mental health services
Case management (US health system), a specific term used in the health care system of the United States of America
Medical case management, a general term referring to the facilitation of treatment plans to assure the appropriate medical care is provided to disabled, ill or injured individuals
Legal case management, a set of management approaches for law firms or courts